Belton railway station was a station that served the village of Belton on the Isle of Axholme in Lincolnshire, England on the Axholme Joint Railway.

History
The station was opened for goods on 14 November 1904, and to passengers on 2 January 1905. The station closed with the end of passenger services on the line on 17 July 1933.

Route

References

Disused railway stations in the Borough of North Lincolnshire
Former Axholme Joint Railway stations
Railway stations in Great Britain opened in 1905
Railway stations in Great Britain closed in 1933